Enteromius punctitaeniatus is a species of ray-finned fish in the genus Enteromius, which is widespread in West Africa from Senegal to Nigeria.

References 

 

Enteromius
Fish described in 1954
Taxa named by Jacques Daget